The One Doctor is a Big Finish Productions audio drama based on the long-running British science fiction television series Doctor Who.

Plot
The Sixth Doctor and Mel come up against an impostor Doctor and his companion Sally-Anne.

During the serial, the Doctor and his companions undertake a quest to find the three greatest treasures of the Generios system.

The story was essentially Big Finish's Christmas panto, and features an extra Christmas scene as a hidden track at the end of the story. The episodes are heavily laden with comedy such as the impostor Doctor's name, Banto Zame, seeming to be an intentional rhyme with Panto Dame.

The Shelves of Infinity
Banto Zame and Mel Bush arrive on Generios Eight to try to locate one of the treasures, The Shelves of Infinity (Unit ZX419). The Shelves of Infinity were designed and created by the Assembler race on Generios Eight, considered the pinnacle of their race. The pieces that make up the shelves are constantly phasing in and out of this dimension, so they can never be completely assembled. The Shelves of Infinity were stored in Warehouse ZX under the code ZX419.

Banto and Mel encounter the Assemblers and manage to convince them to let them take unit ZX419, but only if they could assemble it. Banto scoffs, saying it will be easy. Once the two start building the shelves, they notice parts are going missing. The instructions make sense, but they never get any closer to actually building it. Eventually, they come up with a way to fool the Assemblers: since the building process can never be finished, the Assemblers do not know what the finished product would look like.

The Assemblers are fooled long enough for the Doctor to arrive in the TARDIS, and Banto and Mel escape with the Shelves of Infinity.

Mentos

Another of the treasures, Mentos (also known as the Mentos Device), is an advanced computer and information retrieval system. It is one of the three treasures of the Generios system in the far future, described by the Doctor as the "vulgar end of time".

Mentos appears in our universe as a small metal box that projects the holographic image of an old man which acts as its real world interface. The box is actually a portal to a shadow universe which is populated by countless information collectors—research devices that travel through time and space, constantly seeking out the answer to any given question. As a result, Mentos literally knows everything there is to know.

Mentos was made to participate in Superbrain, a game show (a parody of The Weakest Link). However, as Mentos was able to answer every question put to it, the game continued endlessly. Eventually, the two factions which were vying for control of the Mentos device fought and wiped each other out, along with the codes that would shut down the Questioner and end the game. Mentos, programmed to continue answering questions until it got a wrong answer, outlasted the civilisation that created it by over 330 centuries.

The Doctor arrived on Generios Fourteen to collect Mentos. An alien cylinder was holding Generios One, the capital planet of the system, hostage, threatening to destroy it unless the people of Generios handed over their three greatest treasures. Unable to disconnect the computer without ending the game, the Doctor tried to stump Mentos without success until he and Sally Anne Stubbins asked it what it did not know. With Mentos being unable to answer that question, the game ended, with its score a "pitiful" 679,330,567,010 credits. The Doctor was then able to disconnect the device and take it with him.

During the Doctor's initial attempts to outwit Mentos, the computer tiredly asked him if he was going to ask it "one of those tricky fox-the-computer logic conundrums", like the liar paradox. In the Third Doctor serial The Green Death, the Doctor asked the rogue artificial intelligence BOSS the same question. Mentos, however, stated that it would not have made a difference—it is able to answer those kinds of questions as well.

The Lonely Jelloid!

The final episode of the play mainly focuses on the Doctor and co. attempting to retrieve a giant crystal from a planet guarded by a large, lonely jelloid organism (voiced by Matt Lucas — Lucas also voiced the cylinder).  At the play's conclusion it is revealed that the cylinder was actually after the Doctor all along and the request for the three treasures was a trap — as only the Doctor could have retrieved them.  Banto Zame is wrongly identified as the Doctor and is taken away to face punishment for the Doctor's future actions. The Doctor later comments that he shall rescue Zame from this fate.

Also, there are two hidden tracks that appear at the end of the CD. The first is a short scene in which The Doctor and Mel attempt to view the Queen's Speech on the Time and Space Visualiser. The Second is of Mentos and the Quiz Host. This latter scene is extensive and is composed of a question-and-answer format heard during the third episode. Both hidden scenes have the characters wish everyone listening a happy Christmas.

Cast
The Doctor — Colin Baker
Mel — Bonnie Langford
Citizen Sokkery — Nicholas Pegg
Councillor Potikol — Stephen Fewell
Banto Zame — Christopher Biggins
Sally-Anne Stubbins — Clare Buckfield
Guard — Mark Wright
Cylinder Voice — Matt Lucas
The Questioner — Jane Goddard
Mentos — Nicholas Pegg
Assembler 1 — Adam Buxton
Assembler 2 — Stephen Fewell
The Jelloid — Matt Lucas

Continuity
The Ninth Doctor also encounters a version of the Weakest Link in the new series TV story "Bad Wolf", this time actually voiced by its real host Anne Robinson.
The CD features a bonus track which involves The Doctor and Mel attempting to watch The Queen's Christmas Message on the Time-Space Visualiser, a machine seen in the First Doctor story The Chase.  It is used again by the Sixth Doctor in the 2012 audio, The Fourth Wall.
Clare Buckfield's sister, Julie, has also appeared in a Big Finish Doctor Who Audio.
Episode three's opening and closing theme is the abandoned Delaware version from 1973.
The Tenth Doctor also encounters a character who is mistaken for the actual doctor in "The Next Doctor".
Matt Lucas would later appear in the TV show as the Twelfth Doctor's companion, Nardole.

Outside references
The Doctor and Mel at the beginning are playing Monopoly.

References

External links
Big Finish Productions - The One Doctor

Sixth Doctor audio plays
2001 audio plays
Fiction with unreliable narrators